Henry Kolowrat (August 25, 1933 – March 16, 2021) was an American fencer. He was born in Prague into a noble Kolowrat family. He moved with his parents to the United States in 1948 after the communist coup d'état in Czechoslovakia. He became a U.S. citizen in 1956. He competed in the team épée event at the 1960 Summer Olympics.

References

External links

1933 births
2021 deaths
American male épée fencers
Olympic fencers of the United States
Fencers at the 1960 Summer Olympics
Sportspeople from Prague
Pan American Games medalists in fencing
Pan American Games gold medalists for the United States
Fencers at the 1959 Pan American Games
Bohemian nobility
American people of Czech descent
20th-century American people
21st-century American people